Bhatpara Assembly constituency is an assembly constituency in North 24 Parganas district in the Indian state of West Bengal.

Overview
As per orders of the Delimitation Commission, No. 105 Bhatpara Assembly constituency is composed of the following: Ward Nos.1 to 17 of Bhatpara municipality.

Bhatpara Assembly constituency is part of No. 15 Barrackpore (Lok Sabha constituency).

Members of Legislative Assembly

Election results

2021

2019 By-Election

2016

2011
In the 2011 election, Arjun Singh of Trinamool Congress defeated his nearest rival Nepaldeb Bhattacharya of CPI(M).

.# Swing calculated on Congress+Trinamool Congress vote percentages taken together in 2006.

1977–2006
In the 2006 and 2001 state assembly elections Arjun Singh of Trinamool Congress won the Bhatpara assembly seat defeating Harimohan Nath of CPI (M) in 2006 and Ramprasad Kundu of CPI (M) in 2001. Contests in most years were multi cornered but only winners and runners are being mentioned. Bidyut Ganguly of CPI (M) defeated Dharampal Gupta of Congress in 1996 and Kedar Singh of Congress 1991. Satyanarayan Singh of Congress defeated Siva Prasad Bhattacharya of CPI (M) in 1987. Sita Ram Gupta of CPI (M) defeated Debi Ghosal of Congress in 1982 and Satya Narayan Singh of Congress in 1977.

1951–1972
Satyanarayan Singh of Congress won in 1972 and 1971. Sitaram Gupta of CPI(M) won in 1969. Dayaram Beri of Congress won in 1967 and 1962. Sitaram Gupta of CPI won in 1957. In independent India's first election in 1951, Dayaram Beri of Congress won from Bhatpara.

References

Assembly constituencies of West Bengal
Politics of North 24 Parganas district